Ann Victoria "A V." Christie (February 2, 1963 – April 7, 2016) was an American poet.

Life
Ann Victoria Christie was born in Redwood City, California. She was raised in California's San Francisco Bay area as well as in Montana, and British Columbia. A graduate of Vassar College, she received her master of fine arts degree from the University of Maryland. She was a visiting writer and writer-in-residence at colleges along the Pennsylvania Main Line and regionally, including Villanova and La Salle universities; Bryn Mawr College; Goucher College in Baltimore; the University of Maryland, College Park; and Penn State Abington.

Her first poetry collection, Nine Skies, won the 1996 National Poetry Series prize. The poet Henri Cole described it as "hard-bitten, luxuriant and true," and the Philadelphia-area poet Eleanor Wilner called it "diamond-faceted, elliptical." W.S. DiPiero said of her 2014 collection The Wonders that "her poems invoke and respect strangeness and make strangeness feel near."

Her poems, reviews, and interviews appeared in AGNI, American Poetry Review, Poetry, Excerpt, Iowa Review, Commonweal, The Journal, Ploughshares, and Prairie Schooner.

Her collection The Housing (2004) was co-winner of the Robert McGovern Publication Prize. The Wonders (2014), a chapbook-length poem and Editor's Selection, was published by Seven Kitchens Press. Her chapbook And I Began to Entertain Doubts was published in May 2016 by Folded Word Press.

Death
Christie died of breast cancer in West Chester, Pennsylvania, aged 53.

Awards
 1997 National Poetry Series, for Nine Skies
 2004 Robert McGovern Publication Prize co-winner, for The Housing
 National Endowment for the Arts Fellowship
 Maryland State Arts Council Fellowship
 Pennsylvania State Arts Council Fellowship
 Ludwig Vogelstein Fellowship

Works
 
 The Housing. Ashland Poetry Press. 2004.
 The Wonders. Seven Kitchens Press. 2014.

Anthologies

References

1963 births
2016 deaths
20th-century American poets
21st-century American poets
American women poets
Vassar College alumni
20th-century American women writers
21st-century American women writers
People from Redwood City, California
Poets from California
Deaths from breast cancer
Deaths from cancer in Pennsylvania